The following is a list of libraries located in Philadelphia, Pennsylvania, active in the 19th century. Included are public libraries, academic libraries, medical libraries, church libraries, government libraries, circulating libraries, and subscription libraries.

A
 Academy of Natural Sciences
 Agnes Irwin's School
 Almshouse library
 American Baptist Historical Society
 American Baptist Publication Society
 American Catholic Historical Society
 American Entomological Society
 American Institute of Architects, Philadelphia Chapter
 American Philosophical Society (est. 1743).
 American Sunday-School Union
 Apprentices' Library Company
 Athenaeum of Philadelphia

B
 Baptist Historical Society
 George E. Blake's circulating library
 Board of Missions of Presbyterian Church
 Boarding and Day School for Young Ladies
 Broad Street Academy Library
 Brotherhead's Circulating Library
 Burd Orphan Asylum
 Byberry Library

C
 Carpenters' Company
 Catholic Philopatrian Society
 Central High School
 Chalk's Circulating Library, North Third St.
 Challen's Circulating Library
 Chase's Circulating Library
 Chestnut Hill Free Library
 Chestnut St. Female Seminary
 Christ Church Hospital
 Christ Church Library
 Christian Hall Library Company
 Church of the Holy Apostle, Sunday School Library
 College Avenue Anat. School
 College of Physicians of Philadelphia
 College of St. Thomas of Villa Nova
 Colored Reading Society
 Controllers of Public Schools Library
 Edward Corfield's circulating library

D
 Disston Library
 Drexel Institute Library (est.1891)

E
 Eastburn Academy Library
 Eastern State Penitentiary
 Eclectic Medical College
 Edwin Forrest Home
 Engineers Club
 Episcopal Library and Reading Room

F
 Female Medical College
 Florence Lit. Inst. and Library
 Franklin Institute
 Franklin Library Association
 Free Circulating Library for the Blind
 Free Library of Philadelphia (est.1891, opened 1894). Main branch located in City Hall (1894), then in Concert Hall (1895–1910)
 College Settlement branch
 Evening Home branch
 West Philadelphia branch
 Free Reading-Room Association of Spring Garden
 Friends' Asylum for the Insane
 Friends' Library
 Friends' Observatory

G
 George Institute
 German Society of Pennsylvania
 Germantown Library
 Girard College
 Paul Girard's French Circulating Library
 Girl's Normal School Library
 Grand Army Republic, Post No.2
 Grand Lodge of Pennsylvania F.A.A.M.
 D. Guillemet's French Circulating Library

H
 Hahnemann Medical College
 Harwood's Circulating Library
 Hebrew Literature Society
 Historical Society of Pennsylvania
 Home Teaching and Free Circulating Library for the Blind
 Homoeopathic Medical College
 House of Refuge
 Hirst Free Law Library

I
 Institute for Colored Youth
 Institution for the Blind
 Institution for Deaf and Dumb
 Irish Library of the Cathedral

J
 James Page Library Company
 Jefferson Medical College

K
 Kensington Literary Institute (est.1853)

L
 La Salle College
 Law Association of Philadelphia
 Leopold's Circulating Library
 Library and Reading Room Association of 23rd Ward (est.1857)
 Library Association of Friends
 Library Company of Colored Persons
 Library Company of Philadelphia (est. 1731), also called the Philadelphia Library
 Ridgway Branch
 Library of Foreign Classical Literature and Science
 Library of the Four Monthly Meetings of Friends
 Lovett Memorial Free Library

M
 Mantua Academy
 Mariners' Church Library for Seamen
 Sarah McDonald's circulating library, S. 11th St.
 Mechanics' Institute of Southwark
 Medical Institute of Philadelphia
 Medico-Chirurgical College
 Memorial Free Library (Mount Airy)
 Mercantile Library Company
 Ann Miller's circulating library
 Moyamensing Literary Institute (est.1852)
 Mutual Library Co.

N
 New Church Book Association
 North Broad Street Select School
 Northern Dispensary of Philadelphia
 Northern Home
 Northern Liberties Franklin Library
 Northern Liberties Library and Reading Room Co. (est.1830)
 Numismatic and Antiquarian Society

O
 Odd Fellows' Library

P
 Page Library
 Peirce College of Business
 Pennsylvania Academy of the Fine Arts
 Pennsylvania College, Medical Dept.
 Pennsylvania College of Dental Surgery
 Pennsylvania Horticultural Society
 Pennsylvania Hospital Medical Library
 Pennsylvania Hospital for the Insane
 Pennsylvania Institution for Deaf and Dumb
 Pennsylvania Seamen's Friend Society
 Philadelphia Board of Trade
 Philadelphia City Institute
 The Philadelphia Club Library
 Philadelphia College of Dental Surgery
 Philadelphia College of Medicine
 Philadelphia College of Pharmacy
 Philadelphia County Prison
 Philadelphia Divinity School
 Philadelphia Hospital Library
 Philadelphia Library Association of Colored Brethren
 Philadelphia Maritime Exchange
 Philadelphia Museum library
 Philadelphia Public Library (est.1892), administered by the city Board of Education. Also called City Library
 Branch no.1: Montgomery Ave. and 17th St.
 Branch no.2: Broad and Federal St.
 Branch no.3: Frankfort Ave.
 Branch no.4: Roxboro
 Branch no.5: West Philadelphia Institute, 40th St.
 Branch no.6: Main St. and Chelten Ave., Germantown
 Philadelphia School of Anatomy
 Philadelphia Seminary
 Philadelphia Society for Promoting Agriculture
 Philadelphia Turngemeinde
 Philips' Circulating Library, Third St.
 John Phillips' circulating library, South Fourth St.
 Polytechnic College
 Mrs. S. Potts' circulating library, Walnut St.
 Presbyterian Board of Publication
 Presbyterian Historical Society
 Presbyterian Home for Widows and Single Women
 Public Library for People of Color

R
 Roxborough Lyceum

S
 St. Joseph's College
 St. Timothy's Workingmen's Club and Institute
 Seamen's and Landsmen's Aid Society
 Shallus's Circulating Library
 Social Art Club
 Society of Students' library
 Southwark Library Company (est.1822)
 Spring Garden Institute (est.1835)

T
 Teachers' Institute of Philadelphia
 Theological Seminary (Mount Airy)
 Theological Seminary Reformed Presbyterian Church
 Theological Seminary St. Charles of Boromeo
 Three Monthly Meetings of Friends

U
 Union Circulating Library
 Union League Library
 United States Mint
 United States Naval Home
 United States Navy Yard
 Universal Peace Union
 University of Pennsylvania
 Furness Library
 Law Department
 Medical Department

W
 Wagner Free Institute of Science
 Walnut St. Female Seminary
 West Philadelphia Institute
 Western Library Association of Philadelphia (est.1854)
 Wills Hospital
 Wilson's Circulating Library, South 11th St.
 Wistar Medical College
 Women's Christian Association
 Women's Hospital

Y
 YMCA Philadelphia
 Young Men's Institute

See also
 Books in the United States

References

Further reading
 
 
  (reprinted from the Philadelphia Record)
 

 
Libraries in Philadelphia
Libraries in 19th-century Philadelphia
Libraries
Philadelphia
Libraries
Libraries in 19th-century Philadelphia